Miguel Cané (27 January 1851 – 5 September 1905) was an Argentinian writer, lawyer, academic, journalist and politician.

Cané was born in Montevideo, Uruguay, where his family was exiled. He moved to Argentina at the age of two following the fall of Juan Manuel de Rosas. After finishing his studies he worked as a journalist.

Cané held numerous political offices, including minister of external affairs, minister of the interior, provincial and national member of parliament and mayor of Buenos Aires. He also served as a diplomat in Colombia, Venezuela and France. He was a member of the national senate between 1898 and 1904, representing Buenos Aires.

Cané's works included Ensayos (Essays) (1876); Juvenilia (1884), based on memories of his childhood and teenage years; En Viaje 1881-1882 (1884) and Prosa Ligera (1903), a collection of literary writings. Other writings were published posthumously as Discourses and Lectures (1909).

A prominent member of the Generation of '80, Cané was influenced by naturalism and the Parnassian poets.

He died in Buenos Aires, Argentina.

See also
Al Conti, a relative

External links
 
 

1851 births
1905 deaths
People from Montevideo
Uruguayan emigrants to Argentina
Argentine people of Catalan descent
Argentine male writers
Argentine journalists
Male journalists
Members of the Argentine Senate for Buenos Aires
Members of the Argentine Chamber of Deputies elected in Buenos Aires
Argentine diplomats
Foreign ministers of Argentina
Mayors of Buenos Aires
Burials at La Recoleta Cemetery
Ministers of Internal Affairs of Argentina